Waverley is a suburb in the Eastern suburbs of Sydney, in the state of New South Wales, Australia. Waverley is located 7 kilometres east of the Sydney central business district, in the local government area of Waverley Council.

Waverley Council takes its name from the suburb but its administrative centre is located in the adjacent suburb of Bondi Junction, which is also a major commercial centre.  Waverley is the highest point of altitude in Sydney's Eastern Suburbs.

History

Waverley takes its name from a home built near Old South Head Road in 1827 by Barnett Levey (or Levy) (1798–1837). It was named Waverley House, after the title of his favourite book, Waverley, by author Sir Walter Scott. Waverley Municipality was proclaimed in June 1859. The house was a distinctive landmark and gave its name to the surrounding suburb.

Waverley Cemetery (South Head General Cemetery) was established in 1877 and is one of Australia's most notable cemeteries due to its cliff-side location. The cemetery features the graves of several notable Australians including poet Henry Kendall and aviator Lawrence Hargrave.

Edina, a late Victorian mansion built on a grand scale in Birrell Street by Ebenezer Vickery for himself and his family, was completed around 1884. Vickery was a leading merchant and a prominent patron of the Methodist Church. Other buildings in the group include Banksia, Witchagil and the Nellie Vickery Memorial Chapel. Banksia and Witchagil are two-storey villas that Vickery built for his sons.

This distinguished group of Victorian buildings is now used as the War Memorial Hospital. Edina, Banksia and Witchagil are on the (now defunct) Register of the National Estate. Other heritage items in Waverley include the two weatherboard cottages in Judges Lane, off Bronte Road. A building in Waverley once collapsed into a large hole that swallowed ten houses and an entire street.

Heritage listings
Waverley has a number of heritage-listed sites, including:
 240 Birrell Street: St Mary's Anglican Church, Waverley
 45 Victoria Street: Mary Immaculate Catholic Church, Waverley, designed by John Hennessy in 1912. Its twin-towered design is said to be reminiscent of the Italian Renaissance and is an example of the Federation Academic Classical style.
 Victoria Street, Presbyterian Church (Jubilee Church currently) was designed by Sydney architects Messrs Nixon and Allen. The foundation stone was laid by Mrs. Grahame on 8 May 1897.
 Victoria Street, the Catholic Friary was demolished in 1985 after sustaining extensive fire damage (see gallery below).

Population
In the 2016 Census, there were 4,346 people in Waverley. 54.1% of people were born in Australia. The most common countries of birth were England 7.9% and New Zealand 2.7%. 69.6% of people only spoke English at home.  The most common responses for religion were No Religion 32.0% and Catholic 24.7%.

Commercial area

Waverley is mostly residential with a scattering of commercial developments, centred on the road junction known as Charing Cross.

Schools
Waverley is home to a number of schools.
 Waverley College is a Christian Brothers school for boys made up of Our Lady's Mount Campus in Birrell Street, (Senior School Years 7-12), Waterford Campus in Henrietta Street (Junior School Years 5–6) and Waterford Pre School.
 St Catherine's School is an Anglican, Day and Boarding school for girls, located in Albion Street.
 St Clare's College is a Catholic, high school for girls in Church Street.
 St Charles' Primary School, Waverley. A Catholic primary school next door to St Clare's.

Sport and recreation

Waverley is represented in one of the most popular sporting competitions across Australia, the National Rugby League competition, by the local team the Sydney Roosters, officially the Eastern Suburbs District Rugby League Football Club (ESDRLFC).

The following clubs, including the Roosters, are located in or represent the Waverley area:
 Sydney Roosters Rugby League Club (based at the Eastern Suburbs Leagues Club, in Bondi Junction).
 Waverley Rugby Club - Rugby Union
 Eastern Suburbs Cricket Club
 Bondi United - Rugby League
 Waverley Bowling Club
 St Charles Waverley - Rugby League
 * Waverley Old Boys Football Club - Football (Soccer)
 Waverley Amateur Radio Society - The oldest continuously licensed amateur radio club in Australia. The society was founded in Waverley in 1919 and is now located in nearby Rose Bay

Notable residents
Current and former notable residents include:

 Millicent Armstrong (1888–1973), born in Waverley, was a playwright and farmer who wrote primarily about the experiences of country life in early 20th century Australia.
 Susan Cullen-Ward (1941–2004), Crown Princess of Albania. 
 Crown Princess Mary of Denmark (Mary Donaldson) (born 1972), a resident of Porter Street near Bronte Road, and formerly involved in Eastern Suburbs real estate before her marriage to Crown Prince Frederik of Denmark.
 Reg Lindsay (1929–2008), country music star. Lindsay was born in Waverley.
 Princess Michael of Kent (born 1945)
 Scott Morrison (born 1968), 30th Prime Minister of Australia (2018–2022). Morrison was born in Waverley.
 Elizabeth Julia Reid (1915–1974), born in Waverley, was a Catholic journalist and Grail movement leader.
 Bob Windle, gold medalist in the 1500m freestyle at the 1964 Summer Olympics. Windle spent his formative years in the suburb.

Schools and churches

Local landmarks
Heritage-listed items in the Waverley area include the following:
 Mary Immaculate Church group, Victoria Street
 St Marys Anglican Church and pipe organ, Birrell Street
 Waverley Reservoir No.1, Paul Street
 Avondale, St Marys Avenue
 War Memorial Hospital group of buildings, Birrell Street
 Bronte Public School, Hewlett Street
 Bronte View, St Thomas Street
 Cadore, Henry Street
 Carthona, Birrell Street
 Chapel, St Clares Convent, Carrington Road
 Char Nez, Brown Street
 Charing Cross hotel, Carrington Road
 Moana, Gardyne Street
 Simpson Park, Macpherson Street
 Sonoma, Bronte Road
 Stone buildings, Waverley Cemetery

References

Citations

Sources 

2016 Census Information

External links

 Official Waverley Cemetery Website

 
Suburbs of Sydney
Waverley Council
Populated places established in the 19th century